En-men-dur-ana (also Emmeduranki) of Zimbir (the city now known as Sippar) was an ancient Sumerian king, whose name appears in the Sumerian King List as the seventh pre-dynastic king of Sumer. He was also the topic of myth and legend, said to have reigned for 21,000 years.

Name 
His name means "chief of the powers of Dur-an-ki", while "Dur-an-ki" in turn means "the meeting-place of heaven and earth" (literally "bond of above and below").

City 
En-men-dur-ana's city Sippar was associated with the worship of the sun-god Utu, later called Shamash in the Semitic language. Sumerian and Babylonian literature attributed the founding of Sippar to Utu.

Myth 
A myth written in a Semitic language tells of Emmeduranki, subsequently being taken to heaven by the gods Shamash and Adad, and taught the secrets of heaven and of earth.  In particular, Emmeduranki was taught arts of divination, such as how to inspect oil on water and how to discern messages in the liver of animals and several other divine secrets.

En-men-dur-ana, held significance among the Pre-Sumerians as he was the ancestor from whom all priests of the Sun God had to be able to trace descent.

See also

Apkallu
History of Sumer
Mesopotamian mythology

References

|-

Antediluvian Sumerian kings
Primordial teachers
Sumerian kings
Entering heaven alive
Divination
Legendary progenitors
Enoch (ancestor of Noah)
Sippar

Enmenduranki is on the Sumerians Kings List. The Sumerians are Non-semitic